Alþýðublaðið (Anglicised to Althydubladid) was a newspaper of the Social Democratic Party (Iceland). It was published between 29 October 1919 and 2 October 1998. The paper was originally published six times a week, but ceased as a daily paper on 1 August 1997. Its last edition came out on 2 October 1998.

References

External links
Published Issues at the National and University Library of Iceland

1919 establishments in Iceland
1998 disestablishments in Iceland
Defunct newspapers published in Iceland
Mass media in Reykjavík
Newspapers established in 1919
Publications disestablished in 1998
Daily newspapers published in Iceland